Ernest Anderson (born November 20, 1960) is a former American football running back in the National Football League and United States Football League. He was drafted by the Detroit Lions in 1984 but played for the  Oklahoma/Arizona Outlaws. He played college football for the Oklahoma State Cowboys. He led the nation in rushing in 1982.

See also
 List of college football yearly rushing leaders

References

External links
Just Sports Stats
College stats

Living people
1960 births
American football running backs
Oklahoma Outlaws players
Arizona Outlaws players
Oklahoma State Cowboys football players